Roger Zirilli (31 December 1910 – 2 June 1955) was a Swiss swimmer. He competed in the men's 100 metre freestyle and the water polo at the 1936 Summer Olympics.

References

External links
 

1910 births
1955 deaths
Swiss male water polo players
Olympic swimmers of Switzerland
Olympic water polo players of Switzerland
Swimmers at the 1936 Summer Olympics
Water polo players at the 1936 Summer Olympics
Place of birth missing
Swiss male freestyle swimmers